is a one-shot Japanese manga written and illustrated by Hinako Takanaga.

Plot
Shingo has always liked guys who are exceptional. His best friend, Koji, is the smartest, fastest, and hottest guy in school. But what Shingo doesn't know is that Koji has worked hard to be so exceptional - and he's doing it to impress Shingo! Why? He's in love with Shingo of course! But all is about to be revealed, because when Shingo's just-as-impressive cousin comes into town, Koji realizes he'll have to confess everything or risk losing his one true love forever...

Publication
Kadokawa Shoten released the manga on January 29, 2004. The manga is licensed in North America as A Capable Man by Tokyopop's imprint, Blu, which released the manga on November 4, 2008. The manga is licensed as Traumboyz in Germany by Tokyopop Germany, which released the manga on March 2007.

Reception
Mania.com's Danielle van Gorder commends the manga for its "nicely distinct" character designs but criticises it for "the reproduction [which] looks slightly muddy, and the screentone replication isn't the greatest". Pop Shock Culture's Isaac Hale commends the manga for its "adorable humor [which] is abundant in every story". Comic Book Bin's Leroy Douresseaux comments on the manga artist's use of "a variety of moods, techniques, and styles to give her stories a variety of temperatures – from hot and sexy to adorable and funny".

References

Comedy anime and manga
2004 manga
Manga anthologies
Josei manga
Yaoi anime and manga